Balarampur is a village development committee in Kapilvastu District in the Lumbini Zone of southern Nepal. Maharajgunj is the biggest and the nearest market area in the VDC.

References 

Populated places in Kapilvastu District